Wirkola is a surname. Notable people with the surname include:

Bjørn Wirkola (born 1943), Norwegian ski jumper
Tommy Wirkola (born 1979), Norwegian film director, producer, and screenwriter

See also
Jumping after Wirkola, Norwergian idiom

Norwegian-language surnames